James Hanrahan was a Gaelic footballer from Ennis, County Clare. He won a Munster Senior Football Championship in 1992 when Clare had a surprise win over Kerry in the final, he played in other finals in 1997 and 2000.

References

External links
 https://web.archive.org/web/20120514025614/http://hoganstand.com/Clare/Profile.aspx

Gaelic football goalkeepers
Clare inter-county Gaelic footballers
Eire Og Ennis Gaelic footballers
People from Ennis
Living people
Year of birth missing (living people)